The 2005 Russian Super Cup was the 3rd Russian Super Cup match, a football match which was contested between the 2004 Russian Premier League champion, Lokomotiv Moscow and the winner of 2003–04 Russian Cup, Terek Grozny. The match was held on 6 March 2005 at the Lokomotiv Stadium in Moscow, Russia. Lokomotiv Moscow beat Terek Grozny 1–0 to win their second Russian Super Cup.

Match details

See also
2005 in Russian football
2004 Russian Premier League
2003–04 Russian Cup

External links
 Official stats

Super Cup
Russian Super Cup
Russian Super Cup 2005
Russian Super Cup 2005
Super Cup
Super Cup
Sports competitions in Moscow